Daniel  Kanell (born November 21, 1973) is a former professional American football quarterback in the National Football League (NFL) and Arena Football League who is currently employed by CBS Sports, along with Fox Sports 1 and SiriusXM. 

He was formerly employed by ESPN as an analyst and host on the Russillo and Kanell show on ESPN Radio. He was also the host of ESPNU's late-night sports and humor show UNITE before the show was canceled in June 2013. 

He would also appear on ESPN's new College Football Playoff Selection Show alongside Rece Davis, Joey Galloway, and Kirk Herbstreit. His career with ESPN ended on April 26, 2017.

College career
He attended Florida State University, where he played quarterback for four years. In 1992, as a freshman, Kanell won the job of backing up starter Charlie Ward, the team's first freshman backup since Chip Ferguson in 1985. After doing well in occasional backup play, he won the job again as a sophomore in 1993, despite increased competition. The team later moved to alternating between Kanell and fellow sophomore Jon Stark as backups, though Kanell was given the start when Florida State held out Ward against Maryland due to bruised ribs and Kanell responded by completing 28 of 38 passes for 341 yards, five touchdowns, and no interceptions. Overall that year, he threw for 499 yards with 7 TD vs. 0 INT while backing up Ward, who won the Heisman Trophy, Davey O'Brien, Maxwell, and Walter Camp Awards that year.

In his junior year, he threw for 2,781 yards with 17 TD vs 13 INT on 380 pass attempts. He was a part of the famous Choke at Doak game against Florida, where he led Florida State back from a 31-3 fourth quarter deficit to tie the game. He then beat Florida in the rematch at the Sugar Bowl dubbed the "Fifth Quarter in the French Quarter", finishing the year with a 10–1–1 record.

In his senior year (1995), he threw for 2,957 yards with 32 TD vs 13 INT on 402 pass attempts. He led the team to a 10–2 record, including a win over Notre Dame in the 1996 Orange Bowl. He was given an "honorable mention" in the All-American list of his senior year.  He was also the starting quarterback for Florida State's first loss to an ACC opponent, as the Virginia Cavaliers defeated Florida State 33-28 on November 2, 1995. While throwing for more than 450 yards during the game, Kanell also threw 3 interceptions and completed less than 50% of his passes. One of those interceptions was thrown at the Virginia 2 yard line late in the first half.

During his career at the university he played in 35 games and completed 62.2% of his 851 pass attempts. He threw for 6,372 yards, 57 touchdowns (at the time a school record) and 26 interceptions over his four years as a Seminole. He also ran for one touchdown and managed to catch one pass for a loss of three yards. In September 2012 Kanell was inducted into the Florida State Athletic Hall of Fame.

Kanell also played baseball during his freshman and sophomore years, playing in seven games over the two seasons. He was drafted in the 25th round by the New York Yankees in the 1993 Major League Baseball Draft.

Professional career
Kanell was drafted by the New York Giants in the fourth round (135th overall) in the 1996 NFL Draft. He made his NFL debut later that season. The next season in New York, Kanell became the starter and played the last ten games of the 1997 season, leading the Giants to the NFC Eastern Division title. In those ten games he threw for 1,740 yards with eleven touchdowns and nine interceptions. The Giants played in the playoffs against the Minnesota Vikings but lost 23–22. Kanell went 13/32 with 199 yards and one touchdown in that game. The following year, Kanell started all ten games he played in while throwing for 1,303 yards, eleven touchdowns and ten interceptions. With a record of 3–7 at that point, the Giants benched Kanell in favor of Kent Graham, who led the Giants to a 5–1 record down the stretch and an 8–8 finish. At the end of the season the Giants signed Kerry Collins from the New Orleans Saints and cut Kanell to make enough salary cap room to pay Collins' salary.

In the off season Kanell found a home with the Atlanta Falcons as a backup to their oft injured starting quarterback Chris Chandler. He played in Atlanta for two years, starting two games and playing in eight. As a Falcon he completed 99 of 200 attempted passes for a total of 1,117 yards, six touchdowns and nine interceptions. At the end of the 2000 season he was cut by the Falcons and did not sign with another team.

A year later, Kanell signed with the New York Dragons of the Arena Football League for the 2002 season, appearing in four games in Aaron Garcia's absence. Following that, he was signed during training camp by the Denver Broncos. He made the roster as the third-string quarterback in Denver but was let go shortly through the season. Seven games into the season, starting quarterback Jake Plummer and backup quarterback Steve Beuerlein suffered foot and hand injuries, respectively. Kanell was recalled to the Broncos and started two games until Beuerlein and Plummer returned. He threw two touchdowns and five interceptions on 103 pass attempts. Kanell remained with the Broncos for one more year as the backup to Plummer. He never played, as Plummer became the first Broncos quarterback in franchise history to take every offensive snap. After the 2004 season, he was cut by the Broncos and was not picked up by another NFL team.

NFL career statistics

Baseball career
Kanell was drafted out of high school by the Milwaukee Brewers in the 19th round, and after his junior year at Florida State by the New York Yankees in the 25th round. However, he saw football as more important and signed with the New York Giants when he was drafted in 1996.

During a layoff from football in 2001, Kanell returned to baseball, playing in the minor leagues for the Atlantic League's Newark Bears. He played at first base, third base and designated hitter, hitting for a .237 average with one home run in 79 plate appearances for the Bears. Kanell said he wanted to eventually play for the Yankees, as he had grown up idolizing Yankees first baseman Don Mattingly.

Broadcasting career
Kanell was employed at ESPN, during which he hosted ESPNU's, UNITE and served as color analyst for Friday Night college football games and college baseball. Kanell made several guest appearances on ESPN Radio's SVP (Scott Van Pelt) & Russillo.  It was announced that he would co-host The Russillo Show full-time after frequent guest appearances. Starting in September 2015, Kanell took on his role as co-host to the new show Russillo and Kanell. On April 26, 2017, Kanell was among approximately 100 staffers let go by ESPN in a cost-cutting measure. On August 28, 2017, Kanell joined Fox Sports 1 as a college football analyst, and became the host of his own radio show on SiriusXM. In 2018, he began hosting ‘Dog Day Sports’ with Steve Torre on Mad Dog Sports Radio, SiriusXM channel 82.

See also
History of the New York Giants (1994-present)

References

1973 births
Living people
American football quarterbacks
Atlanta Falcons players
College football announcers
Denver Broncos players
Florida State Seminoles football players
Florida State University alumni
Newark Bears players
New York Giants players
Players of American football from Fort Lauderdale, Florida
New York Dragons players
Baseball players from Florida
Florida State Seminoles baseball players